Nitratifractor is a genus of bacteria from the order Campylobacterales, with one known species (Nitratifractor salsuginis).

References

Campylobacterota
Bacteria genera